Sisir Kumar Saha was an Indian politician. He was elected to the Lok Sabha, the lower house of the Parliament of India as a member of the Indian National Congress.

References

External links
Official biographical sketch in Parliament of India website

Indian National Congress politicians
1896 births
Year of death missing